Joseph Kiambukuta Londa, known as Josky Kiambukuta, (14 February 1949 – 7 March 2021) was a Congolese performing artist, singer, songwriter and composer. As a member of TPOK Jazz he played alongside Franco during their most popular period in the mid-1960s until the late 1980s.

Early life 
Joseph Kiambukuta Londa was born in Gombe-Matadi on Valentine's Day of 1949, to Bernard Bakiansuni and Albertine Londa.

Musical career

Early musical career 
Kiambukuta joined Dr. Nico's group, African Fiesta Sukisa in 1969. During his stay in the band, he recorded one of his first hits, "Sadi Naboyi Masumu". Two years later, in 1971, he leaves to form his band Orchestre Continental with other young musicians including Wuta Mayi and Bopol Mansiamina. He recorded and composed another hit, “Nakobondela”, during his time with the band.

TPOK Jazz 
Kiambukuta joined TPOK Jazz  in 1973. Kiambukuta is known for his range of voice, from very high notes to deep bass, as the need arises. He is credited with composing many songs for the band, including “Chandra”, “Fariya”, “KSK” and “Bimansha”.

Josky eventually left the group, along with Ntesa Dalienst in 1985. The two began solo careers and frequently collaborated. During his early solo career, he released an album with Dalienst and Serge Kiambukuta, his cousin. He also participated in the first Koffi Olomide albums.

Kiambukuta returned to TPOK Jazz in 1987. The following year he released his second album "Mata Kita Bloqué", which contains the eponymous hit.

Bana OK 
After the death of Franco in 1989, TPOK Jazz continued to play for four years. However, in 1994, conflicts forced the band to split up. Kiambukuta, together with Simaro Lutumba, Ndombe Opetum and other band members went on to form a new band: Bana OK. Kiambukuta is reported to have migrated to France and was a resident of Paris.

Illness and death
Kiambukuta is reported to have retired from music circa 2009. He is also reported to have been in ill-health, for several years before his death. He died in a Kinshasa hospital on 7 March 2021 at the age of 72.

Solo discography

 Mehida (1983)
 Mata Kita Bloqué (1988)
 So.Pe.Ka (1988, with Mayaula Mayoni, Madilu System and Malage de Lugendo)
 Chandra (1989)
 Destin / La Sincérité (1989)
 Dernier Avertissement (1999)
 Oui Ça Va (2003)
 Double Vie (2005)
 Chiffre 3 (2005, with Madilu System)

See also
 Franco Luambo Makiadi
 Sam Mangwana
 Simaro Lutumba
 TPOK Jazz
 List of African musicians

References

External links
Lengthy Interview With Simaro Lutumba In 2002 About TPOK Jazz & Bana OK

1949 births
2021 deaths
20th-century Democratic Republic of the Congo male singers
Soukous musicians
TPOK Jazz members
Democratic Republic of the Congo musicians
21st-century Democratic Republic of the Congo male singers
21st-century Democratic Republic of the Congo people